Parliamentary elections were held in Sudan on 21 April and 8 May 1965. Due to the civil war the seats in the south of the country were left vacant until by-elections on 8 March and 18 April 1967.  The result was a second successive victory for the Umma Party, which won 90 of the 173 seats. Voter turnout was 58.1%.

Results

These results include the 1967 by-elections.

References

Elections in Sudan
1965 in Sudan
Sudan
National Legislature (Sudan)
Election and referendum articles with incomplete results